Thomas de Bermingham was an Anglo-Irish lord who died in 1375.

De Bermingham was the great-grandson of the founder of Athenry, Meyler de Bermingham, and great-great-grandson of the re-founder of Dunmore.

Little is directly recorded of his term. One of the few mentions occurs in 1373:
Mac-an-Pharson Mac Feorais [Bermingham] was slain by Turlough Roe O'Conor, with one stroke of his sword, in Conmaicne [Dunmore] (after they the Berminghams had acted treacherously towards him, as he was coming from Conmaicne Cuile), and afterwards made his escape, in despite of his enemies, by the strength of arm, but severely wounded. Andreas Mac Kenny was afterwards put to death by them the Berminghams, he having been left with them by Turlough,—when they had acted treacherously towards him,—as a hostage, in whose ransom they might demand what they pleased.

References
 The Abbey of Athenry, Martin J. Blake, Journal of the Galway Archaeological and Historical Society, volume II, part ii, 1902
 The Birmingham family of Athenry, H. T. Knox, J.G.A.H.S., volume ten, numbers iii and iv, 1916-17.
 The Birmingham chalice, J. Rabbitte, J.G.A.H.S., volume 17, i and ii, 1936-27
 The Second Battle of Athenry, Adrian James Martyn, East Galway News & Views, September 2008-April 2009

External links
 Medieval Ireland: an encyclopedia
 Edenderry Historical Society
 The Fitzgeralds: Barons of Offaly

People from County Galway
Normans in Ireland
Norman warriors
14th-century Irish people
Barons Athenry
Thomas
People of Conmaicne Dúna Móir